Candace S. Greene is a museum anthropologist on the staff of the Department of Anthropology, National Museum of Natural History, Smithsonian Institution.

Life 
She graduated with an M.A.in anthropology (1976) from Brown University, and a Ph.D. (1985) from the University of Oklahoma. 
She is the author of numerous studies focusing on the material culture and visual culture of indigenous tribal societies of the Great Plains region.

She was recognized with the Distinguished Service/Lifetime Achievement Award by the Council for Museum Anthropology in 2018, the Council for Museum Anthropology’s Michael M. Ames Prize for Innovative Museum Anthropology in 2012 and a Webby Award in 2005. This award was in recognition of her contribution to the field of museum anthropology through her founding and leading of Summer Institute in Museum Anthropology (2009–present), a National Science Foundation-funded training program that prepares graduate students for research work using museum collections as a key data source.

Works 

 Silver Horn: Master Illustrator of the Kiowas  University of Oklahoma Press 2002. 
 One Hundred Summers: A Kiowa Calendar Record (University of Nebraska Press, 2009) 
 {ed} The Year the Stars Fell: Lakota Winter Counts at the Smithsonian (University of Nebraska Press, 2007)

References 

American anthropologists
Living people
American women anthropologists
21st-century American scientists
21st-century American women scientists
21st-century American non-fiction writers
21st-century American women writers
Year of birth missing (living people)
Smithsonian Institution people
Webby Award winners
Brown University alumni
University of Oklahoma alumni